Chapman Ranch is an unincorporated community in southeastern Nueces County, Texas, United States, 7 mi (11 km) south of Corpus Christi. It is named for a family who purchased  of the King Ranch in 1919.

References

Unincorporated communities in Nueces County, Texas
Unincorporated communities in Texas